Bapla is a town in the Diébougou Department of Bougouriba Province in south-western Burkina Faso. The town has a population of 1,883.

References

External links
Satellite map at Maplandia.com

Populated places in the Sud-Ouest Region (Burkina Faso)
Bougouriba Province